Berkeley Square is a town square in the West End of London.

Berkeley Square may also refer to:

 Berkeley Square, Bristol
 Berkeley Square, Trenton, New Jersey
 Berkeley Square (play), a 1926 theatrical science fiction romance, and its film adaptations:
 Berkeley Square (1933 film), a science fiction romance, based on the play
 The House in the Square, a British film remake
 Berkeley Square (1959 film), a Hallmark Hall of Fame production
 Berkeley Square (TV series), a 1998 miniseries
 Berkeley Square (club), a former music venue in Berkeley, California

See also
 Berkley Square, a Las Vegas district
 Berkeley Square Historic District (disambiguation)
 Berkeley  (disambiguation)
 "A Nightingale Sang in Berkeley Square", a 1939 popular song
 A Nightingale Sang in Berkeley Square (film), named after the song